Broughton-in-Furness railway station served the market town of Broughton-in-Furness, in Lancashire, England (now in Cumbria). It was on the branch line to Coniston.

History 

In 1848 the Furness Railway extended its line from Barrow to Kirkby-in-Furness to nearby Broughton-in-Furness with the intention of serving local copper mines. Authorised by Parliament in August 1857 the extension to Coniston was open less than two years later, in June 1859. British Railways closed the station and the branch to passengers in 1958 and goods in 1962.

The station building remains.

References

Sources

External links 

The Broughton-in-Furness station site today
Broughton-in-Furness on a navigable 1946 O. S. map NPE maps
The station on an Edwardian 6" OS map National Library of Scotland
The station and line Rail Map Online
The station and line with mileages Railway Codes

Former Coniston Railway stations
Disused railway stations in Cumbria
Railway stations in Great Britain opened in 1848
Railway stations in Great Britain closed in 1962
1848 establishments in England
Broughton-in-Furness